Suzanne Lenglen and Elizabeth Ryan were the defending champions, but Lenglen was forced to withdraw from their quarterfinal match due to health problems.

Hazel Wightman and Helen Wills defeated Phyllis Covell and Kitty McKane in the final, 6–4, 6–4 to win the ladies' doubles tennis title at the 1924 Wimbledon Championships.

Draw

Finals

Top half

Section 1

Section 2

The nationalities of Mrs van Praagh and Mrs Gregson are unknown.

Bottom half

Section 3

Section 4

The nationality of Mrs BL Bisgood is unknown.

References

External links

Women's Doubles
Wimbledon Championship by year – Women's doubles
Wimbledon Championships - Doubles
Wimbledon Championships - Doubles